The Single European Sky ATM Research 3 Joint Undertaking is an institutionalised European public-private partnership, established in 2021, to accelerate through research and development the delivery of the Digital European Sky, as part of the SESAR project. Initiated in 2004, the SESAR project is the technological arm of the EU's Single European Sky initiative to integrate EU Member States' ATM systems. Bringing together the EU, Eurocontrol, and more than 50 organisations covering the entire aviation value chain, including drones, this European partnership is investing more than EUR 1.6 billion between now and 2030 to accelerate, through research and innovation, the delivery of an inclusive, resilient and sustainable Digital European Sky.

Overview 
Advancing innovations applied today in the digital economy will result in a radical transformation of Europe’s aviation infrastructure, making air transport smarter, more sustainable, connected and accessible to all. Transforming the infrastructure that supports European aviation cannot be done by any one organisation or country. It requires close collaboration between all the stakeholders that contribute to it, from the European and national decision-makers that regulate it, the organisations and staff that operate it, to the academic and industry stakeholders that research, design and manufacture it. A public-private partnership that is strongly linked to policy and regulation through an institutional partnership offers the best means to coordinate all the stakeholders, pooling the critical mass of resources and expertise needed to deliver the Digital European Sky.

The SESAR 3 JU builds on the work and achievements of earlier SESAR research and innovation programmes (SESAR 1 and SESAR 2020), but seeks to accelerate the market uptake of innovative solutions through a portfolio of demonstrators and a fast-track mechanism. The partnership acts as a catalyst for speeding up the transition towards a green, climate neutral and digital Europe, and for making European industry more resilient and competitive.

The research programme of the SESAR JU is designed as an innovation pipeline, made up of exploratory research, industrial research and validation and Digital Sky Demonstrators, where ideas are transformed into tangible solutions. These are underpinned by an innovation and market uptake fast-track to get things moving! Calls related to the programme are launched within the framework of the EU’s Horizon Europe or Connecting Europe Facility funding programmes. These are open to private and public ‘for-profit’ and ‘not-for-profit’ organisations, including large enterprises and SMEs, research and technology organisations (RTOs), universities, associations, and any other type of legal entity interested in the SESAR 3 JU’s activities.

Legal basis 
The SESAR Joint 3 Undertaking, was created under Community law  on 21 November 2021.

Funding and budget 
The SESAR 3 JU is co-funded by the European Union through the Horizon Europe research and innovation programme and industry as follows: 
• Horizon Europe - EUR 600 million 
• Eurocontrol – up to EUR 500 million (in-kind and financial contributions) 
• Industry - EUR 500 million minimum (in-kind and financial contributions) In addition, the Digital European Sky programme will benefit from funding for its demonstrators from the Connecting Europe Facility (in coordination with European Climate, Infrastructure and Environment Executive Agency) to the value of at least EUR 200 million.

Members 
 Aeroporti di Roma
 AENA
 Paris Aéroport
 Air France
 Air Navigation Services Czech Republic (ANS CR)
 Airbus SAS
 Airtel ATN Limited
 Alliance for New Mobility Europe (AME)
 Athens International Airport
 Austro Control
 Brussels Airport Company
 Boeing
 BULATSA
 Centro Italiano Ricerche Aerospaziali (C.I.R.A.)
 Croatia Control
 Deutsche Lufthansa
 Deutsches Zentrum fur Luft- und Raumfahrt e.V. (DLR)
 DFS Deutsche Flugsicherung
 The French State – Ministry for an ecological transition, Direction générale de l’aviation civile (DGAC), Direction des services de la navigation aérienne
 Drone Alliance Europe
 easyjet
 Ecole Nationale de l’Aviation Civile (ENAC)
 ENAIRE
 ENAV
 Eurocontrol
 Flughafen München
 Frequentis
 Honeywell
 HungaroControl
 Indra Sistemas
 Irish Aviation Authority
 Copenhagen Airport
 ONERA
 Leonardo S.p.A
 Prague Airport
 Luftfartsverket
 Luchtverkeersleiding Nederland
 Navegação Aérea de Portugal
 Naviair
 Nederlands Lucht- en Ruimtevaartcentrum
 Pipistrel Vertical Solutions
 Polish Air Navigation Services Agency
 ROMATSA
 Ryanair
 SAAB
 SAFRAN
 SINTEF
 Amsterdam Airport Schiphol
 Società Esercizi Aeroportuali
 SWEDAVIA
 THALES
 Collins Aerospace
 Volocopter
 VTT Technical Research Centre of Finland

SESAR JU staff 
The SESAR 3 Joint Undertaking is composed of around 40 staff. Andreas Boschen is the current executive director, previous executive directors include Florian Guillermet, now Managing Director of Direction des Services de la navigation aérienne, and Patrick Ky now at EASA.

See also 
 SESAR

References 

 Single European Sky (SES)
 European ATM Master Plan Portal

External links 
 Official website

Joint undertakings of the European Union and European Atomic Energy Community
Air traffic control in Europe
Air traffic control organizations
International aviation organizations